The following is a list of secondary schools in Ontario. Secondary education policy in the Canadian province of Ontario is governed by the Ministry of Education. Secondary education in Ontario includes Grades 9 to 12. The following list includes public secular institutions, public separate schools, and privately managed independent schools in Ontario. All public schools in Ontario (secular and separate) operate as a part of either an English first language school board or a French first language school board.

Although Ontario's secular and separate school systems are both considered public, colloquially the term public school typically distinguishes a secular institution from its separate counterparts: institutions operated by a public secular school board are typically referred to as public schools, whereas institutions operated by a public separate school board are typically referred to as Catholic schools.

Public secular secondary schools may operate under a number of designations, including collegiate institute, high school, and secondary school.

Algoma District

English public

Central Algoma Secondary School, Desbarats
Chapleau High School, Chapleau
Elliot Lake Secondary School, Elliot Lake
Hornepayne High School, Hornepayne
Korah Collegiate & Vocational School, Sault Ste. Marie
Michipicoten High School, Wawa
Superior Heights Collegiate and Vocational School, Sault Ste. Marie
W. C. Eaket Secondary School, Blind River
White Pines Collegiate & Vocational School, Sault Ste. Marie

French public
École secondaire l'Orée des Bois, Dubreuilville
Villa Française des Jeunes, Elliot Lake

English Catholic
Holy Angels Learning Centre, Sault Ste. Marie
St. Mary's College, Sault Ste. Marie

French Catholic
 École secondaire catholique Jeunesse-Nord, Blind River
 École secondaire Notre-Dame-du-Sault, Sault Ste. Marie
 École secondaire Saint-Joseph, Wawa

Brant County

English public

Brantford Collegiate Institute and Vocational School, Brantford
North Park Collegiate and Vocational School, Brantford
Paris District High School, Paris
Pauline Johnson Collegiate & Vocational School, Brantford
Tollgate Technological Skills Centre, Brantford

English Catholic
Assumption College School, Brantford
St. John's College, Brantford

Bruce County

English public

Bruce Peninsula District School, Lion's Head
Kincardine & District Secondary School, Kincardine
Peninsula Shores District School, Wiarton
Saugeen District Secondary School, Port Elgin
Walkerton District Community School, Walkerton

English Catholic
 Sacred Heart High School, Walkerton

Municipality of Chatham-Kent

English public

Blenheim District High School, Blenheim
Chatham-Kent Secondary School, Chatham
John McGregor Secondary School, Chatham
Lambton-Kent Composite School, Dresden
Ridgetown District High School, Ridgetown
Tilbury District High School, Tilbury
Wallaceburg District Secondary School, Wallaceburg

English Catholic
 Ursuline College, Chatham

French Catholic
École secondaire catholique de Pain Court, Pain Court

Cochrane District

English public

École Secondaire Cochrane High School, Cochrane
Hearst High School, Hearst
Iroquois Falls Secondary School, Iroquois Falls
Kapuskasing District High School, Kapuskasing
Roland Michener Secondary School, South Porcupine
Timmins High and Vocational School, Timmins
Northern Lights Secondary School, Moosonee

French public
École secondaire l'Alliance, Iroquois Falls
École Publique Renaissance, Timmins

English Catholic
O'Gorman High School, Timmins

French Catholic

École catholique Georges-Vanier, Smooth Rock Falls
École catholique Nouveau-Regard, Cochrane
École secondaire catholique l'Alliance, Iroquois Falls
École secondaire catholique Cité des Jeunes, Kapuskasing
École secondaire catholique de Hearst, Hearst
École secondaire catholique Thériault, Timmins
La Clef, Timmins

Private
Delores D. Echum Composite School, Moose Factory

Dufferin County

English public
Centre Dufferin District High School, Shelburne
Orangeville District Secondary School, Orangeville
Westside Secondary School, Orangeville

Regional Municipality of Durham

English public

Ajax High School, Ajax
Anderson Collegiate Vocational Institute, Whitby
Bowmanville High School, Bowmanville
Brock High School, Cannington
Clarington Central Secondary School, Bowmanville
Clarke High School, Newcastle
Courtice Secondary School, Courtice
Donald A. Wilson Secondary School, Whitby
Dunbarton High School, Pickering
Durham Alternative Secondary School, Oshawa
Eastdale Collegiate and Vocational Institute, Oshawa
G. L. Roberts Collegiate and Vocational Institute, Oshawa
Henry Street High School, Whitby
J. Clarke Richardson Collegiate, Ajax
Maxwell Heights Secondary School, Oshawa
O'Neill Collegiate and Vocational Institute, Oshawa
Pickering High School, Ajax
Pine Ridge Secondary School, Pickering
Port Perry High School, Port Perry
R. S. McLaughlin Collegiate and Vocational Institute, Oshawa
Sinclair Secondary School, Whitby
Uxbridge Secondary School, Uxbridge

English Catholic

All Saints Catholic Secondary School, Whitby
Archbishop Denis O'Connor Catholic High School, Ajax
Father Leo J. Austin Catholic Secondary School, Whitby
Holy Trinity Secondary School, Courtice
Monsignor John Pereyma Catholic Secondary School, Oshawa
Monsignor Paul Dwyer Catholic High School, Oshawa
Notre Dame Catholic Secondary School, Ajax
St. Mary Catholic Secondary School, Pickering
St. Stephen's Secondary School, Bowmanville

French Catholic
École secondaire catholique Saint-Charles-Garnier, Whitby

French public
École secondaire Ronald-Marion, Pickering

Private
Trafalgar Castle School, Whitby
Kingsway College, Oshawa

Elgin County

English public

Arthur Voaden Secondary School, St. Thomas
Central Elgin Collegiate Institute, St. Thomas
East Elgin Secondary School, Aylmer
Parkside Collegiate Institute, St. Thomas
West Elgin Secondary School, West Lorne

English Catholic
St. Joseph's Catholic High School, St. Thomas

Essex County

English public

Belle River District High School, Belle River
Essex District High School, Essex
General Amherst High School, Amherstburg
Kennedy Collegiate Institute, Windsor
Kingsville District High School, Kingsville
Leamington District Secondary School, Leamington
Riverside Secondary School, Windsor
Sandwich Secondary School, LaSalle
 Tecumseh Vista Academy Secondary School, Tecumseh
Vincent Massey Secondary School, Windsor
W. F. Herman Collegiate Institute, Windsor
Walkerville Collegiate Institute, Windsor
Western Secondary School, Amherstburg
Westview Freedom Academy (formerly named Century Secondary School), Windsor

French public
École secondaire Michel-Gratton, Windsor

English Catholic

Assumption College School, Windsor
Cardinal Carter Catholic High School, Leamington
Catholic Central High School, Windsor
F. J. Brennan Catholic High School, Windsor
Holy Names High School, Windsor
Saint Anne Catholic High School, Lakeshore
St. Joseph's Catholic High School, Windsor
St. Michael's Alternative High School, Essex and Windsor
St. Thomas of Villanova Catholic Secondary School, LaSalle

French Catholic
École secondaire catholique E. J. Lajeunesse, Windsor
École secondaire catholique l'Essor, Tecumseh

Frontenac County

English public

Bayridge Secondary School, Kingston
Frontenac Secondary School, Kingston
Kingston Secondary School, Kingston
La Salle Secondary School, Kingston
Loyalist Collegiate and Vocational Institute, Kingston
Limestone School of Community Education, Kingston
Sharbot Lake High School, Sharbot Lake
Sydenham High School, Sydenham

French public
École secondaire publique Mille-Îles, Kingston

English Catholic
Holy Cross Catholic Secondary School, Kingston
Regiopolis-Notre Dame Catholic Secondary School, Kingston

French Catholic
École secondaire catholique Marie-Rivier, Kingston

Grey County

English public
Georgian Bay Community School, Meaford
Grey Highlands Secondary School, Flesherton
John Diefenbaker Secondary School, Hanover
Owen Sound District Secondary School, Owen Sound

English Catholic
St. Mary's High School, Owen Sound

French Catholic
École secondaire catholique Saint-Dominique-Savio, Owen Sound

Haldimand County

English public
Cayuga Secondary School, Cayuga
Dunnville Secondary School, Dunnville
Hagersville Secondary School, Hagersville
McKinnon Park Secondary School, Caledonia

Haliburton County

English public
Haliburton Highlands Secondary School, Haliburton

Regional Municipality of Halton

English public

Abbey Park High School, Oakville
Acton District High School, Acton
Aldershot High School, Aldershot
Burlington Central High School, Burlington
Craig Kielburger Secondary School, Milton
Dr. Frank J. Hayden Secondary School, Burlington
Garth Webb Secondary School, Oakville
Georgetown District High School, Georgetown
Iroquois Ridge High School, Oakville
M. M. Robinson High School, Burlington
Milton District High School, Milton
Nelson High School, Burlington
Oakville Trafalgar High School, Oakville
T. A. Blakelock High School, Oakville
White Oaks Secondary School, Oakville

French public
École secondaire Gaétan Gervais, Oakville

English Catholic

Assumption Catholic Secondary School, Burlington
Bishop Paul Francis Reding Catholic Secondary School, Milton
Christ the King Catholic Secondary School, Georgetown
Corpus Christi Catholic Secondary School, Burlington
Holy Trinity Catholic Secondary School, Oakville
Notre Dame Catholic Secondary School, Burlington
St. Francis Xavier Catholic Secondary School, Milton
St. Ignatius of Loyola Catholic Secondary School, Oakville
St. Thomas Aquinas Catholic Secondary School, Oakville

French Catholic
École secondaire catholique Sainte-Trinité, Oakville

Private
 Appleby College, Oakville
 St. Mildred's-Lightbourn School, Oakville
 King's Christian Collegiate, Oakville

Hamilton

English public

Ancaster High School, Ancaster
Dundas Valley Secondary School, Dundas
Glendale Secondary School, Hamilton
Nora Frances Henderson Secondary School, Hamilton
Orchard Park Secondary School, Stoney Creek
Saltfleet District High School, Stoney Creek
Sherwood Secondary School, Hamilton
Sir Allan MacNab Secondary School, Hamilton
Sir Winston Churchill Secondary School, Hamilton
Waterdown District High School, Waterdown
Westdale Secondary School, Hamilton
Westmount Secondary School, Hamilton

French public
École secondaire Georges-P.-Vanier, Hamilton

English Catholic

 Bishop Ryan, Hamilton
Bishop Tonnos, Ancaster
 Cathedral High School, Hamilton
 Good Shepherd Hamilton, Downtown Hamilton
 St. Jean de Brebeuf Secondary School, Hamilton
 St. John Henry Newman, Stoney Creek
St. Mary Catholic Secondary, Hamilton
 St. Thomas More, Hamilton

French Catholic
École secondaire Académie catholique Mère-Teresa, Hamilton

English private
Columbia International College, Westdale
Hamilton District Christian High School, Ancaster
Hillfield Strathallan College, West Mountain Hamilton
Southern Ontario College, Downtown Hamilton

Hastings County

English public

Bayside Secondary School, Belleville
Centennial Secondary School, Belleville
Centre Hastings Secondary School, Madoc
Eastside Secondary School, Belleville (formerly Moira)
North Hastings High School, Bancroft
Trenton High School, Trenton

French public
École secondaire publique Marc-Garneau, Trenton

English Catholic/Christian
Nicholson Catholic College, Belleville
Quinte Christian High School, Belleville
St. Paul Catholic Secondary School, Trenton
St. Theresa Catholic Secondary School, Belleville

First Nations Private
Ohahase Education Centre, Tyendinaga Mohawk Territory

Huron County

English public
Central Huron Secondary School, Clinton
F. E. Madill Secondary School, Wingham
Goderich District Collegiate Institute, Goderich
South Huron District High School, Exeter

English Catholic
St. Anne's Catholic Secondary School, Clinton

Kawartha Lakes

English public
Fenelon Falls Secondary School, Fenelon Falls
I. E. Weldon Secondary School, Lindsay
Lindsay Collegiate and Vocational Institute, Lindsay

English Catholic
St. Thomas Aquinas Secondary School, Lindsay

Kenora District

English public

Beaver Brae Secondary School, Kenora
Crolancia Secondary School, Pickle Lake
Dryden High School, Dryden
Ignace High School, Ignace
Northern Eagle High School, Ear Falls
Sioux North High School, Sioux Lookout
Red Lake District High School, Red Lake
Vezina Secondary School, Attawapiskat

English Catholic
St. Thomas Aquinas Secondary School, Kenora

Lambton County

English public

Alexander Mackenzie Secondary School, Sarnia
Great Lakes Secondary School, Sarnia
Lambton Collegiate and Vocational Institute, Petrolia
North Lambton Secondary School, Forest
Northern Collegiate Institute and Vocational School, Sarnia

French public
École secondaire Franco-Jeunesse, Sarnia

English Catholic
St. Christopher Catholic Secondary School, Sarnia
St. Patrick Catholic High School, Sarnia

French Catholic
École secondaire catholique Saint-François-Xavier, Sarnia

Lanark County

English public
Almonte and District High School, Almonte
Carleton Place High School, Carleton Place
Perth and District Collegiate Institute, Perth
Smiths Falls District Collegiate Institute, Smiths Falls

English Catholic
Notre Dame Catholic High School, Carleton Place
St. John Catholic High School, Perth
St. Luke Catholic High School, Smiths Falls

Leeds and Grenville United Counties

English public

Athens District High School, Athens
Brockville Collegiate Institute, Brockville
Gananoque Secondary School, Gananoque
North Grenville District High School, Kemptville
Rideau District High School, Elgin
South Grenville District High School, Prescott
Thousand Islands Secondary School, Brockville

English Catholic
St. Mary Catholic High School, Brockville
St. Michael Catholic High School, Kemptville

French Catholic
Académie catholique Ange Gabriel, Brockville

Lennox and Addington County

English public
Ernestown Secondary School, Odessa
Napanee District Secondary School, Napanee
North Addington Education Centre (K-12), Cloyne

Manitoulin District

English public
Manitoulin Secondary School, M'Chigeeng

Middlesex County

English public

A. B. Lucas Secondary School, London
B. Davison Secondary School, London
Clarke Road Secondary School, London
Glencoe District High School, Glencoe
H. B. Beal Secondary School, London
London Central Secondary School, London
London South Collegiate Institute, London
Lord Dorchester Secondary School - Dorchester
Medway High School - Arva
Montcalm Secondary School, London
North Middlesex District High School, Parkhill
Oakridge Secondary School, London
Saunders Secondary School, London
Sir Frederick Banting Secondary School, London
Sir Wilfrid Laurier Secondary School, London
Strathroy District Collegiate Institute, Strathroy

French public
École secondaire Gabriel-Dumont, London

English Catholic

Catholic Central High School, London
Holy Cross Catholic Secondary School, Strathroy
John Paul II Catholic Secondary School, London
Mother Teresa Catholic Secondary School, London
Regina Mundi Catholic College, London
St. Andre Bessette Catholic Secondary School, London
St. Thomas Aquinas Catholic Secondary School, London
St. Mary's Catholic High School, Woodstock

French Catholic
École secondaire catholique Monseigneur-Bruyère, London

District Municipality of Muskoka

English public
Bracebridge and Muskoka Lakes Secondary School, Bracebridge
Gravenhurst High School, Gravenhurst
Huntsville High School, Huntsville

English Catholic
St. Dominic School, Bracebridge

Norfolk County

English public

Delhi District Secondary School, Delhi
Port Dover Composite School, Port Dover
Simcoe Composite School, Simcoe
Valley Heights Secondary School, Walsingham
Waterford District High School, Waterford

English Catholic
Holy Trinity Catholic High School, Simcoe
Sprucedale Secondary School, Simcoe (for youth held in secure custody at Sprucedale Youth Centre, operated under contract from the Ministry of Children, Community and Social Services)

Northumberland County

English public

Campbellford District High School, Campbellford
Cobourg District Collegiate Institute East, Cobourg
Cobourg District Collegiate Institute West, Cobourg
East Northumberland Secondary School, Brighton
Port Hope High School, Port Hope

English Catholic
St. Mary's Secondary School, Cobourg

Regional Municipality of Niagara

English public

A. N. Myer Secondary School, Niagara Falls
Beamsville District Secondary School, Beamsville
DSBN Academy, St. Catharines
E. L. Crossley Secondary School, Fonthill
Eastdale Secondary School, Welland
Eden High School, St. Catharines
Governor Simcoe Secondary School, St. Catharines
Greater Fort Erie Secondary School, Fort Erie
Grimsby District Secondary School, Grimsby
Laura Secord Secondary School, St. Catharines
Port Colborne High School, Port Colborne
St. Catharines Collegiate Secondary School, St. Catharines
Sir Winston Churchill Secondary School (St. Catharines), St. Catharines
Stamford Collegiate Secondary School, Niagara Falls
Thorold Secondary School, Thorold
Welland Centennial Secondary School, Welland
Westlane Secondary School, Niagara Falls

French public
École secondaire Confédération, Welland

English Catholic

Blessed Trinity Catholic Secondary School, Grimsby
Denis Morris Catholic High School, St. Catharines
Holy Cross Catholic Secondary School, St. Catharines
Lakeshore Catholic High School, Port Colborne
Notre Dame College School, Welland
St. Francis Catholic Secondary School, St. Catharines
St. Michael Catholic High School, Niagara Falls
St. Paul Catholic High School, Niagara Falls

French Catholic
École secondaire catholique Saint Jean de Brébeuf, Welland

English private

Ridley College, St. Catharines
Heritage Christian School, Jordan
Jordan Christian School, Jordan
Robert Land Academy, Wellandport
Smithville District Christian High School, Smithville
Eagles Nest Academy, Port Dalhousie

Nipissing District

English public

Chippewa Intermediate & Secondary School, North Bay
F. J. McElligott Intermediate & Secondary School, Mattawa
Laurentian Learning Centre, North Bay
Northern Secondary School, Sturgeon Falls
West Ferris Intermediate & Secondary School, North Bay
Widdifield Secondary School, North Bay

French public
École publique l'Odyssée, North Bay
École secondaire publique Northern, Sturgeon Falls

English Catholic
St. Joseph-Scollard Hall Catholic Secondary School, North Bay

French Catholic
École secondaire catholique Algonquin, North Bay
École secondaire catholique Élisabeth-Bruyère, Mattawa
École secondaire catholique Franco-Cité, Sturgeon Falls

Ottawa

English public

A. Y. Jackson Secondary School
Adult High School
Bell High School
Brookfield High School
Cairine Wilson Secondary School
Canterbury High School
Colonel By Secondary School
Earl of March Secondary School
Glebe Collegiate Institute
Gloucester High School
Hillcrest High School
John McCrae Secondary School
Lisgar Collegiate Institute
Longfields-Davidson Heights Secondary School
Merivale High School
Nepean High School
Osgoode Township High School
Ottawa Technical Learning Centre
Ridgemont High School
Sir Guy Carleton Secondary School
Sir Robert Borden High School
Sir Wilfrid Laurier Secondary School
South Carleton High School
West Carleton Secondary School
Woodroffe High School

French public

École secondaire publique L'Alternative
École secondaire publique De La Salle
École secondaire publique Gisèle-Lalonde
École secondaire publique Louis-Riel
École secondaire publique Omer-Deslauriers

English Catholic

All Saints Catholic High School
Holy Trinity Catholic High School
Immaculata High School
Lester B. Pearson Catholic High School
M. F. McHugh Education Centre
Mother Teresa High School
Notre Dame High School
Sacred Heart High School
St. Francis Xavier Catholic High School
St. Joseph High School
St. Mark Catholic High School
St. Matthew High School
St. Nicholas Adult High School
St. Patrick's High School
St. Paul High School
St. Peter High School
St. Pius X High School

French Catholic

Centre professionel et technique Minto
Collège catholique Franco-Ouest
Collège catholique Samuel-Genest
École secondaire catholique Béatrice-Desloges
École secondaire catholique Franco-Cité
École secondaire catholique Garneau
École secondaire catholique Pierre-Savard

Oxford County

English public

Annandale School, Tillsonburg
College Avenue Secondary School, Woodstock
Glendale High School, Tillsonburg
Huron Park Secondary School, Woodstock
Ingersoll District Collegiate Institute, Ingersoll
Norwich District High School, Norwich
Woodstock Collegiate Institute, Woodstock

English Catholic
St. Mary's Catholic High School, Woodstock

French Catholic
École secondaire catholique Notre-Dame, Woodstock

Parry Sound District

English public
Almaguin Highlands Secondary School, South River
Parry Sound Intermediate & High School, Parry Sound

Regional Municipality of Peel

English public

Applewood Heights Secondary School, Mississauga
Bramalea Secondary School, Brampton
Brampton Centennial Secondary School, Brampton
Castlebrooke Secondary School, Brampton
Cawthra Park Secondary School, Mississauga
Central Peel Secondary School, Brampton
Chinguacousy Secondary School, Brampton
Clarkson Secondary School, Mississauga
David Suzuki Secondary School, Brampton
Erindale Secondary School, Mississauga
Fletcher's Meadow Secondary School, Brampton
Glenforest Secondary School, Mississauga
Harold M. Brathwaite Secondary School, Brampton
Heart Lake Secondary School, Brampton
Humberview Secondary School, Caledon
Jean Augustine Secondary School, Brampton
John Fraser Secondary School, Mississauga
Judith Nyman Secondary School, Brampton
Lincoln M. Alexander Secondary School, Mississauga
Lorne Park Secondary School, Mississauga
Louise Arbour Secondary School, Brampton
Mayfield Secondary School, Caledon
Meadowvale Secondary School, Mississauga
Mississauga Secondary School, Mississauga
North Park Secondary School, Brampton
Port Credit Secondary School, Mississauga
Rick Hansen Secondary School, Mississauga
Sandalwood Heights Secondary School, Brampton
Stephen Lewis Secondary School, Mississauga
Streetsville Secondary School, Mississauga
Thomas L. Kennedy Secondary School, Mississauga
Turner Fenton Secondary School, Brampton
West Credit Secondary School, Mississauga
The Woodlands School, Mississauga

English Catholic

Archbishop Romero Catholic Secondary School, Mississauga
Ascension of Our Lord Secondary School, Mississauga
Cardinal Ambrozic Secondary School, Brampton
Cardinal Leger Secondary School, Brampton
Father Michael Goetz Secondary School, Mississauga
Holy Name of Mary Secondary School, Brampton
Iona Catholic Secondary School, Mississauga
John Cabot Catholic Secondary School, Mississauga
Loyola Catholic Secondary School, Mississauga
Notre Dame Catholic Secondary School, Brampton
Our Lady of Mount Carmel Secondary School, Mississauga
Philip Pocock Catholic Secondary School, Mississauga
Robert F. Hall Catholic Secondary School, Caledon
St. Aloysius Gonzaga Secondary School, Mississauga
St. Augustine Catholic Secondary School, Brampton
St. Edmund Campion Secondary School, Brampton
St. Francis Xavier Secondary School, Mississauga
St. Joan of Arc Catholic Secondary School, Mississauga
St. Joseph's Secondary School, Mississauga
St. Marcellinus Secondary School, Mississauga
St. Marguerite d'Youville Secondary School, Brampton
St. Martin Secondary School, Mississauga
St. Michael Catholic Secondary School, Bolton
St. Paul Secondary School, Mississauga
St. Roch Catholic Secondary School, Brampton
St. Thomas Aquinas Secondary School, Brampton

French public
École secondaire Jeunes sans frontières, Brampton

French Catholic
École secondaire catholique Sainte-Famille, Mississauga

English private
Bronte College, Mississauga
Elpis Academy, Mississauga
Mentor College, Mississauga

Perth County

English public

Listowel District Secondary School, Listowel
Mitchell District High School, Mitchell
St. Marys District Collegiate & Vocational Institute, St. Marys
Stratford Central Secondary School, Stratford
Stratford Northwestern Secondary School, Stratford

English Catholic
St. Michael Catholic Secondary School, Stratford

Peterborough County

English public

Adam Scott Collegiate and Vocational Institute, Peterborough
Crestwood Secondary School, Peterborough
Kenner Collegiate Vocational Institute, Peterborough
Norwood District High School, Norwood
Thomas A. Stewart Secondary School, Peterborough

English Catholic
Holy Cross Secondary School, Peterborough
St. Peter's Secondary School, Peterborough

Prescott and Russell United Counties

English public
Rockland District High School, Rockland
Russell High School, Russell
Vankleek Hill Collegiate Institute, Vankleek Hill

French public
École secondaire publique L'Académie de La Seigneurie, Casselman
École secondaire publique Le Sommet, Hawkesbury

English Catholic
St. Francis Xavier Catholic High School, Hammond
St. Thomas Aquinas Catholic High School, Russell

French Catholic

École secondaire catholique de Casselman, Casselman
École secondaire catholique de Plantagenet, Plantagenet
École secondaire catholique Embrun, Embrun
École secondaire catholique L'Escale, Rockland
École secondaire catholique régionale de Hawkesbury, Hawkesbury

Prince Edward County

English public
Prince Edward Collegiate Institute, Picton

Rainy River District

English public
Atikokan High School, Atikokan
Fort Frances High School, Fort Frances
Rainy River High School, Rainy River

Renfrew County

English public

Arnprior District High School, Arnprior
Fellowes High School, Pembroke
General Panet High School, Petawawa
Mackenzie High School, Deep River
Madawaska Valley District High School, Barry's Bay
Opeongo High School, Douglas
Renfrew Collegiate Institute, Renfrew

French public
École secondaire publique L'Équinoxe, Pembroke

English Catholic
Bishop Smith Catholic High School, Pembroke
St. Joseph's Catholic High School, Renfrew

French Catholic
Centre scolaire catholique Jeanne-Lajoie, Pembroke

Simcoe County

English public

Banting Memorial High School, Alliston
Barrie North Collegiate Institute, Barrie
Bear Creek Secondary School, Barrie
Bradford District High School, Bradford
Collingwood Collegiate Institute, Collingwood
Eastview Secondary School, Barrie
Elmvale District High School, Elmvale
Innisdale Secondary School, Barrie
Georgian Bay District Secondary School, Midland
Nantyr Shores Secondary School, Alcona
Nottawasaga Pines Secondary School, Angus
OD/Park Secondary School, Orillia
Stayner Collegiate Institute, Stayner
Twin Lakes Secondary School, Orillia

French public
École secondaire Le Caron, Penetanguishene
Ecole secondaire Roméo Dallaire, Barrie

English Catholic

Holy Trinity Catholic High School, Bradford
Our Lady of the Bay Catholic High School, Collingwood
Patrick Fogarty School, Orillia
St. Joan of Arc Catholic High School, Barrie
St. Joseph's High School, Barrie
St. Peter's School, Barrie
St. Theresa's Separate School, Midland
St. Thomas Aquinas School, Tottenham

French Catholic
École secondaire catholique Nouvelle-Alliance,  Barrie

Stormont, Dundas and Glengarry United Counties

English public

Charlottenburgh and Lancaster District High School, Williamstown
Cornwall Collegiate and Vocational School, Cornwall
Glengarry District High School, Alexandria
North Dundas District High School, Winchester
Rothwell-Osnabruck Secondary School, Ingleside
St. Lawrence High School, Cornwall
Seaway District High School, Iroquois
Tagwi Secondary School, Avonmore

French public
École secondaire publique L'Héritage, Cornwall

English Catholic
Holy Trinity Catholic Secondary School, Cornwall
St. Joseph's Catholic Secondary School, Cornwall
St. Matthew Catholic Learning Centre, Cornwall

French Catholic
École secondaire catholique La Citadelle, Cornwall
École secondaire catholique Le Relais, Alexandria

Sudbury District

English public

Chapleau High School, Chapleau
Chelmsford Valley District Composite School, Chelmsford
Confederation Secondary School, Val Caron
Espanola High School, Espanola
Lasalle Secondary School, Sudbury
Lively District Secondary School, Walden
Lo-Ellen Park Secondary School, Sudbury
Lockerby Composite School, Sudbury
M. W. Moore Secondary School, Shining Tree
Sudbury Secondary School, Sudbury

French public
École Cap sur l'Avenir, Sudbury
École secondaire de la Rivière-des-Français, Noëlville
École secondaire Hanmer, Hanmer
École secondaire Macdonald-Cartier, Sudbury

English Catholic

Bishop Alexander Carter Catholic Secondary School, Hanmer
Marymount Academy, Sudbury
St. Albert Adult Learning Centre, Sudbury
St. Benedict Catholic Secondary School, Sudbury
St. Charles College, Sudbury

French Catholic

 Carrefour Options+, Sudbury
 Collège Notre-Dame, Sudbury
 École secondaire catholique Champlain, Chelmsford
 École secondaire du Sacré-Cœur, Sudbury
 École secondaire catholique Franco-Ouest, Espanola
 École secondaire catholique l'Horizon, Val Caron
 École secondaire catholique Trillium, Chapleau

Thunder Bay District

English public

Geraldton Composite High School, Geraldton
Hammarskjold High School, Thunder Bay
Lake Superior High School, Terrace Bay
Manitouwadge High School, Manitouwadge
Marathon High School, Marathon
Nipigon-Red Rock District High School, Red Rock
Superior Collegiate and Vocational Institute, Thunder Bay
Westgate Collegiate & Vocational Institute, Thunder Bay

French public
École secondaire Château-Jeunesse, Longlac
École secondaire Cité-Supérieure, Marathon
École secondaire Manitouwadge, Manitouwadge

English Catholic
St. Ignatius High School, Thunder Bay
St. Patrick High School, Thunder Bay

First Nations private
Migizi Miigwanan Secondary School

French Catholic
École secondaire catholique de la Vérendrye, Thunder Bay

Timiskaming District

English public
Englehart High School, Englehart
Kirkland Lake District Composite School, Kirkland Lake
Timiskaming District Secondary School, New Liskeard

French Catholic
École secondaire catholique l'Envolée du Nord, Kirkland Lake
École secondaire catholique Sainte-Marie, New Liskeard
Centre d'éducation des Adultes, New Liskeard

Toronto

English public

 Avondale Alternative Secondary School
 A. Y. Jackson Secondary School
 Agincourt Collegiate Institute
 Albert Campbell Collegiate Institute
 Birchmount Park Collegiate Institute
 Bloor Collegiate Institute
 Burnhamthorpe Collegiate Institute
 C. W. Jefferys Collegiate Institute
 Cedarbrae Collegiate Institute
 Central Etobicoke High School
 Central Technical School
 Central Toronto Academy
 City School
 Danforth Collegiate and Technical Institute
 David and Mary Thomson Collegiate Institute
 Don Mills Collegiate Institute
 Downsview Secondary School
 Dr Norman Bethune Collegiate Institute
 Drewry Secondary School
 Earl Haig Secondary School
 Eastdale Collegiate Institute
 East York Collegiate Institute
 Emery Collegiate Institute
 Etobicoke Collegiate Institute
 Etobicoke School of the Arts
 Forest Hill Collegiate Institute
 George Harvey Collegiate Institute
 George S. Henry Academy
 Georges Vanier Secondary School
 Greenwood Secondary School
 Harbord Collegiate Institute
 Humberside Collegiate Institute
 Inglenook Community High School
 Jarvis Collegiate Institute
 John Polanyi Collegiate Institute
 Kipling Collegiate Institute
 L'Amoreaux Collegiate Institute
 Lakeshore Collegiate Institute
 Lawrence Park Collegiate Institute
 Leaside High School
 Lester B. Pearson Collegiate Institute
 Malvern Collegiate Institute
 Marc Garneau Collegiate Institute
 Martingrove Collegiate Institute
 Monarch Park Collegiate Institute
 Newtonbrook Secondary School
 North Albion Collegiate Institute
 North Toronto Collegiate Institute
 Northern Secondary School
 Northview Heights Secondary School
 Oakwood Collegiate Institute
 Parkdale Collegiate Institute
 R. H. King Academy
 Richview Collegiate Institute
 Riverdale Collegiate Institute
 Rosedale Heights School of the Arts
 Runnymede Collegiate Institute
 School of Experiential Education
 SEED Alternative School
 Silverthorn Collegiate Institute
 Sir John A. Macdonald Collegiate Institute
 Sir Oliver Mowat Collegiate Institute
 Sir Wilfrid Laurier Collegiate Institute
 Sir William Osler High School
 Stephen Leacock Collegiate Institute
 Subway Academy I
 Subway Academy II
 The Student School
 Thistletown Collegiate Institute
 Ursula Franklin Academy
 Victoria Park Collegiate Institute
 W. A. Porter Collegiate Institute
 West Hill Collegiate Institute
 West Humber Collegiate Institute
 Western Technical-Commercial School
 Weston Collegiate Institute
 Westview Centennial Secondary School
 Wexford Collegiate School for the Arts
 William Lyon Mackenzie Collegiate Institute
 Winston Churchill Collegiate Institute
 Woburn Collegiate Institute
 York Humber High School
 York Memorial Collegiate Institute
 York Mills Collegiate Institute

English Catholic

 Alternative Pupil Placement for Limited Expelled Students
 Bishop Allen Academy
 Bishop Marrocco/Thomas Merton Catholic Secondary School
 Brebeuf College School
 Cardinal Carter Academy for the Arts
 Chaminade College School
 Dante Alighieri Academy
 Father Henry Carr Catholic Secondary School
 Father John Redmond Catholic Secondary School and Regional Arts Centre
 Francis Libermann Catholic High School
 James Cardinal McGuigan Catholic High School
 Loretto College School
 Loretto Abbey Catholic Secondary School
 Madonna Catholic Secondary School
 Marshall McLuhan Catholic Secondary School
 Mary Ward Catholic Secondary School
 Michael Power/St. Joseph High School
 Monsignor Fraser College
 Monsignor Percy Johnson Catholic High School
 Neil McNeil High School
 Notre Dame High School
 Senator O'Connor College School
 St. Basil-the-Great College School
 St. Joan of Arc Catholic Academy
 St. John Henry Newman Catholic High School
 St. John Paul II Catholic Secondary School
 St. Joseph's College School
 St. Joseph's Morrow Park Catholic Secondary School
 St. Mary Catholic Academy
 St. Michael's Choir School
 St. Mother Teresa Catholic Academy
 St. Oscar Romero Catholic Secondary School
 St. Patrick Catholic Secondary School

French public
 École secondaire Étienne-Brûlé
 École secondaire Toronto Ouest
 Le Collège français

French Catholic
 École secondaire catholique Monseigneur-de-Charbonnel
 École secondaire catholique Père-Philippe-Lamarche
 École secondaire catholique Saint-Frère-André

Independent
Bayview Glen School
Bishop Strachan School
Branksome Hall
Crescent School
Crestwood Preparatory College
De La Salle College
Elpis Academy
Greenwood College School
Havergal College
Hawthorn School for Girls
North Toronto Christian School
Royal St. George's College
St. Clement's School
St. Michael's College School
Toronto French School
University of Toronto Schools
Upper Canada College
Tanenbaum Community Hebrew Academy of Toronto
York School
Z3 Education Centre

Regional Municipality of Waterloo

English public

Bluevale Collegiate Institute, Waterloo
Cameron Heights Collegiate Institute, Kitchener
Eastwood Collegiate Institute, Kitchener
Elmira District Secondary School, Elmira
Forest Heights Collegiate Institute, Kitchener
Galt Collegiate Institute and Vocational School, Cambridge
Glenview Park Secondary School, Cambridge
Grand River Collegiate Institute, Kitchener
Huron Heights Secondary School, Kitchener
Jacob Hespeler Secondary School, Cambridge
Kitchener-Waterloo Collegiate and Vocational School (KCI), Kitchener
Preston High School, Cambridge
Sir John A. Macdonald Secondary School, Waterloo
Southwood Secondary School, Cambridge
Waterloo Collegiate Institute, Waterloo
Waterloo-Oxford District Secondary School, Baden

English Catholic

Monsignor Doyle Catholic Secondary School, Cambridge
Resurrection Catholic Secondary School, Kitchener
St. Benedict Catholic Secondary School, Cambridge
St. David Catholic Secondary School, Waterloo
St. Louis Adult & Continuing Education, Cambridge and Kitchener
St. Mary's High School, Kitchener

French Catholic
École secondaire Père-René-de-Galinée, Cambridge

Private Schools
Rockway Mennonite Collegiate, Kitchener
Scholars' Hall University Preparatory School, Kitchener
St. Jude's Special Education Day School, Kitchener
St. John's-Kilmarnock School, Breslau
Our Lady of Mount Carmel Academy, New Hamburg
Woodland Christian High School, Breseau

Wellington County

English public

Centennial Collegiate Vocational Institute, Guelph
Centre Wellington District High School, Fergus
College Heights Secondary School, Guelph
Erin District High School, Erin
Guelph Collegiate Vocational Institute, Guelph
John F. Ross Collegiate Vocational Institute, Guelph
Norwell District Secondary School, Palmerston
Wellington Heights Secondary School, Mount Forest

English Catholic

Bishop Macdonell Catholic High School, Guelph
Our Lady of Lourdes Catholic High School, Guelph
St. James Catholic High School, Guelph

Regional Municipality of York

English public

ACCESS Georgina District High School, Georgina
ACCESS Program Jefferson Community Learning Centre, Richmond Hill
Alexander Mackenzie High School, Richmond Hill
Aurora High School, Aurora
Bayview Secondary School, Richmond Hill
Bill Crothers Secondary School, Markham
Bill Hogarth Secondary School, Markham
Bur Oak Secondary School, Markham
Dr. G.W. Williams Secondary School, Aurora
Dr. John M. Denison Secondary School, Newmarket
Emily Carr Secondary School, Vaughan
Hodan Nalayeh Secondary School, Vaughan (formerly Vaughan Secondary School)
Huron Heights Secondary School, Newmarket
Keswick High School, Keswick
King City Secondary School, King City
Langstaff Secondary School, Richmond Hill
Maple High School, Vaughan
Markham District High School, Markham
Markville Secondary School, Markham
Middlefield Collegiate Institute, Markham
Milliken Mills High School, Markham
Newmarket High School, Newmarket
Pierre Elliott Trudeau High School, Markham
Richmond Green Secondary School, Richmond Hill
Richmond Hill Adult Community Learning School, Richmond Hill
Richmond Hill High School, Richmond Hill
Sir William Mulock Secondary School, Newmarket
Stephen Lewis Secondary School, Vaughan
Stouffville District Secondary School, Stouffville
Sutton District High School, Sutton
Thornhill Secondary School, Thornhill
Thornlea Secondary School, Thornhill
Tommy Douglas Secondary School, Vaughan
Unionville High School, Markham
Westmount Collegiate Institute, Vaughan
Woodbridge College, Vaughan

English Catholic

Cardinal Carter Catholic High School, Aurora
Father Bressani Catholic High School, Woodbridge
Father Michael McGivney Catholic Academy, Markham
Holy Cross Catholic Academy, Woodbridge
Our Lady of the Lake Catholic College School, Keswick
Our Lady Queen of the World Catholic Academy, Richmond Hill
Sacred Heart Catholic High School, Newmarket
St. Augustine Catholic High School, Markham
St. Brother André Catholic High School, Markham
St. Elizabeth Catholic High School, Thornhill
St. Jean de Brebeuf Catholic High School, Woodbridge
St. Joan of Arc Catholic High School, Maple
St. Luke Catholic Learning Centre, Thornhill
St. Maximillian Kolbe Catholic High School, Aurora
St. Robert Catholic High School, Thornhill
St. Theresa of Lisieux Catholic High School, Richmond Hill

French Catholic
École catholique Pape-François, Whitchurch-Stouffville
École secondaire catholique Renaissance, Aurora

French public
École secondaire Norval-Morrisseau, Richmond Hill

Independent
Pickering College, Newmarket
St. Andrew's College, Aurora
Villanova College (Canada), Richmond Hill

See also
 List of school districts in Ontario
 Cantab College, (1934-?) possibly defunct

Notes

References

High